Ivan Doseff (September 26, 1884 – May 3, 1973) was a Bulgarian-American football player and coach of football, basketball, and track, and college athletics administrator. He served as the head football coach at Kalamazoo College in 1910, at Iowa State Teachers College—now known as the University of Northern Iowa—from 1919 to 1920, and at Luther College in Decorah, Iowa from 1921 to 1922, compiling a career college football record of 12–18–3.

Coaching career
Doseff was the head football coach at Kalamazoo College in Kalamazoo, Michigan for one season, in 1910, compiling a record of 1–5–1.

Death
Doseff died on May 3, 1973.

Head coaching record

College football

References

External links
 

1884 births
1973 deaths
American football tackles
Chicago Maroons football coaches
Chicago Maroons football players
Cornell Rams football coaches
Kalamazoo Hornets football coaches
Luther Norse football coaches
Luther Norse men's basketball coaches
Northern Iowa Panthers athletic directors
Northern Iowa Panthers football coaches
Northern Iowa Panthers men's basketball coaches
College track and field coaches in the United States
High school basketball coaches in Illinois
High school football coaches in Illinois
High school football coaches in Wisconsin
Bulgarian emigrants to the United States